2017–18 FIBA Europe Cup play-offs will begin on 7 March and conclude on 25 April and 2 May 2018 with the 2018 FIBA Europe Cup Finals, to decide the champions of the 2017–18 FIBA Europe Cup. A total of 16 teams will compete in the play-offs.

Format
The play-offs involves 16 teams which qualified as winners or second placed of each one of the four groups in the second round.

Each tie in the knockout phase, is played over two legs, with each team playing one leg at home.

The draw will be made without any restriction or seeding, being decided all the bracket by the luck of the draw in the round of 16. If two teams from the same previous round are paired, the team with the best record in the last round would play the second leg at home. If a FIBA Europe Cup team is drawn against a Basketball Champions League team, the FIBA Europe Cup side would have the home-court advantage in the second leg. 
This rule apply for all the rounds of the play-offs.

Qualified teams

Teams from the second round
The four group winners and second-placed teams from the second round advanced to the play-offs. In case of vacants due to opt-out options of teams transferred from the Basketball Champions League, these places would be filled with the best third-qualified teams.

Standings

Transfers from Champions League regular season
Eight teams from the 2017–18 Basketball Champions League Regular season transfer to the FIBA Europe Cup. These include the fifth and sixth-placed teams. Movistar Estudiantes, Élan Chalon, AEK Athens and SIG Strasbourg, had opt-out clauses from playing in the FIBA Europe Cup and in the event of them claiming fifth or sixth place, their spot would be filled by the best-ranked third-placed teams from the second round.

Standings

Bracket

Round of 16
The first legs will be played on 6 and 7 March, and the second legs will be played on 13 and 14 March 2017. Team 2 plays the second leg at home.

|}
Notes

First leg

Second leg

Quarterfinals
The first legs will be played on 20 and 21 March, and the second legs will be played on 27 and 28 March 2018. Team 2 plays the second leg at home.

|}

First leg

Second leg

Semifinals
The first legs will be played on 11 April, and the second legs will be played on 18 and 19 April 2018. Team 2 plays the second leg at home.

|}

First leg

Second leg

Finals

The first legs will be played on 25 April, and the second legs will be played on 2 May 2018. Team 2 plays the second leg at home.

|}

References

External links
 

2017–18 FIBA Europe Cup
FIBA Europe Cup Play-offs